Dinokana is a town in Ngaka Modiri Molema District Municipality in the North West province of South Africa.

Early settlement 
The area became the main town of the Bahurutshe in 1849, when Kgosi Moiloa I settled it with about 1,500 people, who had been displaced following the Difaqane war. Moiloa was accompanied by the Reverend Walter Inglis of the London Missionary Society.

In 1875, a succession dispute in the aftermath of Moiloa's death led to the displacement of many BaHurutshe, and nearly half of the population moved to Gopane.

Anti-apartheid history 
Dinokana was the centre of the Bahurutshe resistance of the 1950s. Kgosi Abram Ramotshere Moiloa was bannished by the Apartheid Government in 1957 after he refused to enforce the carrying of passbooks by Hurutshe women as obliged by apartheid law. The women of Dinokana had largely refused to carry the passbooks, and Kgosi Moiloa had supported their decision. At the first meeting held by the native commissioner, 1000 women gathered but only 70 passbooks were taken out, Kgosi Moiloa was deposed a week later. Better known as the Zeerust uprising or the Hurutshe revolt, a popular uprising engulfed Lehurutshe in reaction to the punitive actions of the apartheid state, led particularly by the women of Lehurutse.

Bophuthatswana 
Dinokana haa primary schools and high schools.

References

Populated places in the Ramotshere Moiloa Local Municipality
Populated places established in 1849
1849 establishments in Africa